Mathias J. "Matt" Berres (November 20, 1863 – December 7, 1954) was an American politician and farmer.

Born in West Bend, Wisconsin, Berres moved with his parents to the town of Rib Falls in Marathon County, Wisconsin. He worked in the lumber industry and in saw mills before settling on a farm in Rib Falls. He served as chairman and clerk of the Rib Falls Town Board, justice of the peace, school board clerk, and as chairman of the Marathon County Board of Supervisor. Berres served in the Wisconsin State Assembly in 1927 and was a Republican.

Notes

1863 births
1954 deaths
People from Marathon County, Wisconsin
People from West Bend, Wisconsin
Farmers from Wisconsin
County supervisors in Wisconsin
Mayors of places in Wisconsin
Wisconsin city council members
School board members in Wisconsin
Republican Party members of the Wisconsin State Assembly
American justices of the peace